Antonio Gómez Valdés de Castillo (January 4, 1930 – January 6, 2021), better known as Ratón Valdés, was a Mexican actor and comedian, brother of the actors Germán, Manuel and Ramón. Antonio participated in the programs La Cosa and Puro Loco, tracing the origin of his career during the Golden Age of Mexican cinema, where he participated in several films with his brothers.

Filmography

Series

Films

Documentaries

Death 
Antonio passed away on Wednesday, January 6, 2021, at the age of 91, from a heart attack that occurred while he was sleeping. His death marked the end of the Valdes dynasty.

References 

1930 births
2021 deaths
Mexican male comedians
Mexican male film actors
Mexican male telenovela actors
Mexican male television actors
Mexican people of Spanish descent
Mexican people of Italian descent
People from Mexico City
20th-century comedians
21st-century comedians
20th-century Mexican male actors
21st-century Mexican male actors